Aacharya Nand Dulare Bajpai was born in the village Magrair, Unnao. He was a famous Hindi critic. He was born on 27 August 1906 and died on 21 August 1967. He was head of Hindi Department at Kashi Hindu Vishwavidyalaya from 1941-1947. He also served as Vice-Chancellor at Vikram University, Ujjain from 1 October 1965 onwards.

Editorial duties
Bharat during 1930-33
Soor Sagar during 1933-36
Ram Charit Manas during 1937-39

Publications
'Hindi Sahitya'
'Biiswin Shatabdi'
'Aadhunik Sahitya'
'Naya Sahitya Naye Prashna'
'Kavi Nirala'
'Kavi Prasad'
'Maha Kavi Tulsidas'

1906 births
1967 deaths
Academic staff of Vikram University
Indian critics